The 1998 BYU Cougars football team represented Brigham Young University during the 1998 NCAA Division I-A football season. The Cougars were led by 27th-year head coach LaVell Edwards and played their home games at Cougar Stadium in Provo, Utah. The team competed as members of the Western Athletic Conference, winning a share of the Pacific Division title with a conference record of 7–1. The Cougars advanced to the 1998 WAC Championship Game over division co-champion San Diego State due to a head-to-head victory. After losing to Air Force in the conference championship game, BYU was invited to the 1998 Liberty Bowl, where they were defeated by the undefeated Tulane Green Wave. This was BYU's last season in the WAC before joining the Mountain West Conference in 1999.

Schedule

Roster

References

BYU
BYU Cougars football seasons
BYU Cougars football